The Intersport Cup, formerly known as the Møbelringen Cup, is an annual women's handball tournament arranged by the Norwegian Handball Federation. Norway plus three invited national teams compete for the title, normally in a single round-robin format.

The tournament is usually held in November, prior to the European or World Championship. It was first arranged in 2001, when the Norwegian Handball Federation reached an agreement with furniture company Møbelringen.

Results

References

 
Women's handball in Norway
International handball competitions hosted by Norway
2001 establishments in Norway
Recurring sporting events established in 2001